Communication design is a mixed discipline between design and information-development which is concerned with how media communicate with people. A communication design approach is not only concerned with developing the message in addition to the aesthetics in media, but also with creating new media channels to ensure the message reaches the target audience. Some designers use graphic design and communication design interchangeably due to overlapping skills.

Communication design can also refer to a systems-based approach, in which the totality of media and messages within a culture or organization are designed as a single integrated process rather than a series of discrete efforts. This is done through communication channels that aim to inform and attract the attention of the people one is focusing one's skills on. Design skills must be tailored to fit to different cultures of people, while maintaining pleasurable visual design. These are all important pieces of information to add to a media communications kit to get the best results.

Within the discipline of Communication, a framework for Communication as Design has emerged that focuses on redesigning interactivity and shaping communication affordances. Software and applications create opportunities for and place constraints on communication. Recently, Guth and Brabham examined the way that ideas compete within a crowdsourcing platform, providing a model about the relationships among design ideas, communication, and platform. The same authors have interviewed technology company founders about the democratic ideals they build into the design of e-government applications and technologies. Interest in the Communication as Design framework is growing among researchers.

Overview
Communication design seeks to attract, inspire, create desires and motivate people to respond to messages, with a view to making a favorable impact. This impact can be to the bottom line of the commissioning body, which can be either to build a brand or move sales. It can also range from changing behaviors, to promoting a message, to disseminating information. The process of communication design involves strategic business thinking, using market research, creativity, problem-solving, and technical skills and knowledge such as colour theory, page layout, typography and creating visual hierarchies. Communications designers translate ideas and information through a variety of media. Their particular talents lie not only in the traditional skills of the hand, but also in their ability to think strategically in design and marketing terms, in order to establish credibility  and influence audiences through the communication.

The term communication design is often used interchangeably with visual communication, but has an alternative broader meaning that includes auditory, vocal, touch and smell. Examples of communication design include information architecture, editing, typography, illustration, web design, animation, advertising, ambient media, visual identity design, performing arts, copywriting and professional writing skills applied in the creative industries.

Education
Students of communication design learn how to create visual messages and broadcast them to the world in new and meaningful ways. In the complex digital environment around us, communication design has become a powerful means of reaching out to the target audience. Students learn how to combine communication with art and technology. Communication Design discipline involves teaching how to design web pages, video games, animation, motion graphics and more.

Communication Design has content as its main purpose. It must achieve a reaction, or get customer to see a product in a genuine way to attract sales or get a message across. Students of Communications Design are often Illustrators, Graphic Designers, Web designers, Advertising artists, Animators, Video Editors, Motion graphic artists, or even Printmakers and Conceptual Artists. The term Communications Design is fairly general and practitioners work in various mediums to get a message across.

Subdisciplines
 Advertising
 Art direction
 Brand management
 Content strategy
 Copywriting
 Creative direction
 Graphic design
 Illustration
 Industrial design
 Information architecture
 Information graphics
 Instructional design
 Marketing communications
 Performing arts
 Presentation
 Technical writing
 Visual arts

Visual communication design

Visual communication design is the design working in any media or support of visual communication. This is considered by some to be more correct  terminology to cover all types of design applied in communication that uses visual channel for transmission of messages, precisely because this term relates to the concept of visual language of some media and not limited to support a particular form of content, as do the terms graphic design (graphics) or interface design (electronic media).

See also
Design elements and principles
Communication studies

Footnotes

External links 
 Dossier Communication Design in Germany of the Goethe-Institut

 
Design
Advertising campaigns
Writing
Packaging
Communication studies

de:Kommunikationsdesign